Rebecca Howard (born May 9, 1979, in Salmon Arm, British Columbia) is a Canadian Equestrian Team athlete in Eventing. She competed at two Summer Olympics (in 2012 and 2016). Her best Olympic results came in 2016, when she placed 10th in both individual and team competitions and was the highest placed female rider.

Howard also represented Canada at the 2010 World Equestrian Games in Kentucky, United States, where she achieved 23rd position in individual eventing. Following year she competed at the 2011 Pan American Games, where she placed 6th in individual and helped Canada in winning a team silver.

In July 2016, she was named to Canada's Olympic team.

References

External links 
 

1979 births
Canadian female equestrians
Equestrians at the 2012 Summer Olympics
Equestrians at the 2016 Summer Olympics
Living people
Olympic equestrians of Canada
People from Salmon Arm
Pan American Games silver medalists for Canada
Pan American Games medalists in equestrian
Equestrians at the 2011 Pan American Games
Medalists at the 2011 Pan American Games
20th-century Canadian women
21st-century Canadian women